† Cheeneetnukiidae is an extinct family of sea snails, marine gastropod mollusks in the clade Vetigastropoda (according to the taxonomy of the Gastropoda by Bouchet & Rocroi, 2005).

This family has no subfamilies.

Genera 
Genera and species within the family Cheeneetnukiidae include:
 Cheeneetnukia Blodgett & Cook, 2002 - type genus
 Cheeneetnukia australis
 Cheeneetnukia frydai
 Cheeneetnukia seminodosa
 Cheeneetnukia spinosa
 Pingtianispira Cook & Pan, 2004
 Pingtianispira tuberculata
 Ulungaratoconcha Blodgett & Cook, 2002
 Ulungaratoconcha bicoronata
 Ulungaratoconcha bigranulosa
 Ulungaratoconcha binodosa
 Ulungaratoconcha bononi
 Ulungaratoconcha coronata (E.J.A. d’Archiac & E.P. de Verneuil, 1842) - synonym: Murchisonia coronata E.J.A. d’Archiac & E.P. de Verneuil, 1842
 Ulungaratoconcha heidelbergeri
 Ulungaratoconcha intermedia
 Ulungaratoconcha lennensis

References